Tingena lassa is a species of moth in the family Oecophoridae. It is endemic to New Zealand and has been observed in Otago. It frequents both subalpine habitat at altitudes up to 1100 meters down to sea level residential areas. This species has frequently been observed resting on rock faces. The adults of this species are found on the wing in November and December.

Taxonomy 

This species was first described by Alfred Philpott using a specimen collected by Charles Edwin Clarke at Leith in Dunedin in December and named Borkhausenia lassa. In 1939 George Hudson discussed and illustrated this species under the name B. lassa. In 1988 J. S. Dugdale placed this species in the genus Tingena. The male holotype specimen is held at the Auckland War Memorial Museum.

Description 

Philpott described this species as follows:

Distribution
This species is endemic to New Zealand and has been observed in Otago.

Habitat 
This species has been observed in both subalpine habitat at altitudes of up to 1100 metres, resting on rock faces, as well as at sea level near a residential stream.

Behaviour 
The adults of this species are on the wing in November and December.

References

Oecophoridae
Moths of New Zealand
Moths described in 1930
Endemic fauna of New Zealand
Taxa named by Alfred Philpott
Endemic moths of New Zealand